The Adjungbilly Creek, a mostlyperennial river that is part of the Murrumbidgee catchment within the Murray–Darling basin, is located in the South West Slopes and Riverina regions of New South Wales, Australia.

Course and features 
The creek descends  over its  course.

See also 

 List of rivers of New South Wales (A-K)
 Rivers of New South Wales

References

External links
 
 

Rivers of New South Wales
Tributaries of the Murrumbidgee River
Rivers in the Riverina